Tribl (pronounced "tribal") is an American contemporary worship music collective originating from Atlanta, Georgia. The collective made its debut in 2021 with the release of Tribl I, a collaborative live album with Maverick City Music. Tribl I debuted at number ten on the Top Christian Albums Chart and number three on the Top Gospel Albums Chart in the United States. Tribl went on to release their second live album, Tribl Nights Atlanta (2021). Tribl Nights Atlanta debuted at number 46 on the Top Christian Albums Chart and number six on the Top Gospel Albums Chart. In 2022, Tribl released Tribl Nights Anthologies, their second collaborative live album with Maverick City Music. Tribl Nights Anthologies debuted at number 41 on the Top Christian Albums Chart and number six on the Top Gospel Albums Chart.

Career
On May 28, Tribl released their debut promotional single, "Still Holy" featuring Ryan Oféi and Naomi Raine, announcing that they will release their debut collaborative album with Maverick City Music titled Tribl I, initially slated for June 11, 2021. Tribl I was ultimately released on July 23, 2021. Tribl I debuted at number ten on the Top Christian Albums Chart, and number three on the Top Gospel Albums Chart in the United States. Tribl then went on to release their second live album, Tribl Nights Atlanta on November 12, 2021. Tribl Nights Atlanta debuted at number 46 on the Top Christian Albums Chart, and number six on the Top Gospel Albums Chart. On April 29, 2022, Tribl and Maverick City Music released Tribl Nights Anthologies, their second collaborative album. Tribl Nights Anthologies debuted at number 46 on the Top Christian Albums Chart, and number six on the Top Gospel Albums Chart.

Members
The current members of Tribl are:
 Ryan Ofei
 Cecily
 Nate Díaz
 Melody Adorno
 Laila Olivera
 Tianna Horsey
 Jessica Hitte
 Montell Moore
 Siri Worku
 Marián Adigun

Discography

Live albums

Singles

Promotional singles

Awards and nominations

GMA Dove Awards

!Ref.
|-
| 2022
| Tribl Nights Atlanta 
| Gospel Worship Album of the Year
|  
| 
|-
|}

See also
 List of Christian worship music artists

References

External links
 

Musical groups established in 2018
Musical groups from Georgia (U.S. state)
Performers of contemporary worship music
2021 establishments in Georgia (U.S. state)